The Machiyar are both Hindi and Muslim community found in the state of Gujarat in India. They also known as the Machhi.

History and origin

The Machiyar are a fishing community distributed throughout the coastal areas of Gujarat from Kutch to south Gujarat. They are first said to have settled at Patan, the historic capital of Gujarat. The community is said to have come from Sindh, and belonged to the Mallaah tribe. They speak Kutchi among themselves. According to other traditions, they are Muslim converts from the Kharwa caste.

Present circumstances

Fishing remains the traditional occupation of the community. They catch fish from the Arabian Sea, using their traditional crafts known as hori. They go out to the sea in groups of three and four persons. The fish is then sold to the Memon or Bhadala communities. Like other Muslim artisan castes, they have a caste council, which maintains strong social control over the community. The community is endogamous, but there are cases of some intermarriage with the Makrani and Malik communities. They do not practice gotra exogamy, and marriages tend to take place among close kin. The community consists of six clans, the Pateliya, Vesilia, Lochani, Iswani, Raria and Nothiya.

See also

 Gujarati Muslims
 Bhadala
 Kharwa

References

Muslim communities of Gujarat
Tribes of Kutch
Sindhi tribes
Fishing communities in India